Syscia is a genus of ants in the subfamily Dorylinae containing thirty eight described species. The genus is distributed widely across the Eastern Asia, North America, and South America.  Syscia was described by Roger (1861), later placed as a Cerapachys subgenus by Wheeler (1902) and then junior synonym of Cerapachys by Kempf (1972).  Syscia was resurrected as a valid genus by Borowiec (2016) during redescription of the doryline genera.

Species

Syscia amblyogyna 
Syscia atitlana 
Syscia augustae 
Syscia austrella 
Syscia benevidesae 
Syscia borowieci 
Syscia boudinoti 
Syscia brachyptera 
Syscia chaladthanyakiji 
Syscia chiapaneca 
Syscia disjuncta 
Syscia grandis 
Syscia honduriana 
Syscia humicola 
Syscia jennierussae 
Syscia lacandona 
Syscia latepunctata 
Syscia machaquila 
Syscia madrensis 
Syscia minuta 
Syscia murillocruzae 
Syscia parietalis 
Syscia parva 
Syscia persimilis 
Syscia pervagata 
Syscia peten 
Syscia pollula 
Syscia quisquilis 
Syscia reticularis 
Syscia setosa 
Syscia sumnichti 
Syscia ticomontana 
Syscia tolteca 
Syscia transisthmica 
Syscia truncata 
Syscia typhla 
Syscia valenzuelai 
Syscia volucris

References

Dorylinae
Ant genera